9 Bullets is a 2022 American action thriller film written and directed by Gigi Gaston, starring Lena Headey, Sam Worthington, and Dean Scott Vazquez. The film was produced in California during the height of the COVID-19 pandemic. Gaston's inspiration for the film was based on her close friendship with the burlesque performer Gypsy Rose Lee. The film was formerly known as Gypsy Moon. It was released in select American theatres on April 22, 2022 by Screen Media, grossed $193,908 in total revenue worldwide, and received generally negative reviews from critics.

Backstory 
9 Bullets writer and director Gigi Gaston, attributes much of her inspiration for the film to her close friendship with the burlesque performer Gypsy Rose Lee. She recalls Lee pointing to her body and stating, “This is what all the men see, but what’s really important is what’s in between my ears.” In the hopes of empowering women, Gaston added strong female characters to the story. Her son, Dash, was also an influence on the story. The film was originally known as Gypsy Moon.

Plot 
Gypsy, a former burlesque dancer who seeks redemption, takes a second chance at life by becoming an author, all while risking everything to rescue Sam, her young neighbor who witnessed his parents' murder. While determined to write her memoir, she spends much of her time trying to bring the boy to safety by evading the local crime boss and her longtime ex-lover, who wants what the boy possesses—access to his missing money.

Cast

Production 
9 Bullets was financed by 120 dB Films, and filmed in Santa Clarita and Los Angeles in California during the height of the COVID-19 pandemic. It was filmed using Alexa Mini cameras, giving it a clean and crisp clarity on 1080p video, with a primary audio soundtrack recorded in 5.1 DTS-HD MA and with a musical score that provides the film with an expansive sound stage. The original score written by Hugo de Chaire is included on the soundtrack album which was released on all major digital music services.

Release 
On February 9, 2022, Screen Media announced that it had acquired all North American rights to the film, and was closing deals in key international markets.  On April 22, 2022, the film had a limited release in select theaters in major U.S. cities and was available on Digital HD from Amazon Prime Video and iTunes. Screen Media began a day-and-date release on its advertising-supported video-on-demand services. The film was released on DVD & Blu-ray on June 7, 2022.

Reception

Box Office 
As of January 28, 2023, 9 Bullets has grossed $10,601 in Europe and the Middle East, and $183,307 in Asia Pacific, for a total worldwide gross of $193,908.

Critical response 
9 Bullets was generally not well received by top film critics. Cath Clarke writes in The Guardian, "Headey is never less than watchable, but what a wasted opportunity." In The Austin Chronicle, Richard Whittaker saw the film as having both, "Lousy plotting and beyond questionable character motivations" which he believes, "bring the story to a constant, grinding halt." Courtney Howard, film reviewer for The A.V. Club, called it "a dud, yet one made semi-palatable thanks to a decent performance from leading lady Lena Headey, and of all things, a soulful ballad written by Diane Warren."

See also

References

External links 
 
 

2020s American films
2020s English-language films
2022 action thriller films
2022 films
American action thriller films
Films shot in California